Cerastium sventenii is a species of flowering plant in the family Caryophyllaceae. It is endemic to the Canary Islands. It grows in moist talus in forested habitat. It is threatened by introduced grazing herbivores and non-native plants.

References

sventenii
Endemic flora of the Canary Islands
Matorral shrubland
Endangered flora of Africa
Taxonomy articles created by Polbot